In Ancient Egyptian religion, Medjed is a minor and obscure god mentioned in the Book of the Dead. His ghost-like portrayal in illustrations on the Greenfield papyrus earned him popularity in modern Japanese culture, including as a character in video games and anime.

Archaeological evidence 
The Book of the Dead refers to a group of Ancient Egyptian funerary texts generally written on papyrus and used from the beginning of the New Kingdom (around 1550 BCE) to around 50 BCE. These texts consist of a number of magic spells, written by priests, intended to assist a dead person's journey through the Duat, or underworld, and into the afterlife. Spell 17 mentions, amongst many other obscure gods, one Medjed (meaning "The Smiter"), in the following line:

E. A. Wallis Budge interpreted the corresponding passage in the New Kingdom Papyri, known as the "Theban Recension of the Book of the Dead" as follows:

In the illustration to the spell on sheet 76 of the Greenfield papyrus, a figure thought to be Medjed is depicted as a dome with a pair of eyes and eyebrows, supported by two human-like feet.

According to John Taylor of the British Museum, nothing else is known about Medjed.

In popular culture 
After the Greenfield papyrus illustrations were exhibited in 2012 at the Mori Art Museum in Tokyo and the Fukuoka Museum of Art, Medjed became a sensation on Japanese social media due to the resemblance to a stereotypical ghost costume. The god was embraced by Japanese popular culture. He became an internet meme, as well as a character in video games and in anime (e.g. as the protagonist of Kamigami no Ki, 2016, and a primary character in Oh, Suddenly Egyptian God, 2020-2023).

Medjed is also the name of the hacker group mentioned in the Atlus game Persona 5.

See also
Ghosts in ancient Egyptian culture
Medjed (fish), believed to have eaten the penis of the god Osiris after his brother Set dismembered and scattered the god's body

References

Notes

Citations

External links

 
 

Internet memes
Book of the Dead
Egyptian gods